The 1582  was part of a border dispute between two daimyō of Japan's Sengoku period. The territories of Oda Nobunaga and the Uesugi clan, led by Uesugi Kagekatsu, met in Etchu Province; both were under threat from the Ikkō-ikki of Etchu, and from one another.

Seeking to ensure the security of Nobunaga's possessions, Shibata Katsuie and Sassa Narimasa, two of his chief generals, rode north from Toyama Castle, and laid siege to both the town of Uozu and nearby Matsukura Castle.  Uozu fell on June 3, 1582, and Oda Nobunaga would die eighteen days later, in Kyoto, in the Incident at Honnō-ji.

References

1582 in Japan
Uozu
Uozu
Conflicts in 1582